The Hongqi HS7 is a 7-seater luxury mid-size crossover SUV produced by the Chinese luxury car manufacturer Hongqi from 2019.

Overview

The Hongqi HS7 is powered by a 3.0 liter supercharged engine producing 337 horsepower and 445 N.m, mated to a Aisin 8-speed automatic gearbox. The 0 to 100 km/h (0-62 mph) acceleration time is 7.8 seconds. For the 2021 model year, a 2.0 liter turbocharged engine producing 252 horsepower and 380 N.m, mated to a 7-speed dual-clutch gearbox is added to the product line.

All 3.0 liter models coming standard with full-time four-wheel drive system while all 2.0 liter models coming standard with rear-wheel drive system.

The interior of the base model includes a 12.3 inch full LCD instrument and a 10.1 inch large central control screen. The price of the Hongqi HS7 ranges from 275,800 yuan to 459,800 yuan (~US$41,273 – US$68,809).

References

External links

Official website

HS7
Crossover sport utility vehicles
Mid-size sport utility vehicles
Luxury sport utility vehicles
All-wheel-drive vehicles
Cars introduced in 2019
2010s cars
2020s cars